The Joseph Slocum House is an historic house on Slocum Road (about 1/4 mile south of Indian Corner Road) in North Kingstown, Rhode Island.  It is a -story wood-frame house, five bays wide, with a large central chimney.  It faces south on the east side of Slocum Road.  The house has been dated to the mid-18th century based on architectural evidence; its first documented owner was Joseph Slocum, in the early 19th century.  The house is a rare surviving 18th-century farmhouse, a type once numerous in the town.

The house was listed on the National Register of Historic Places in 1985.

See also
National Register of Historic Places listings in Washington County, Rhode Island

References

Houses completed in 1750
Houses on the National Register of Historic Places in Rhode Island
Houses in North Kingstown, Rhode Island
National Register of Historic Places in Washington County, Rhode Island